The Sablatnig C.I was a conventional C-type reconnaissance two-seater aircraft developed and built by Sablatnig in Berlin, Germany in 1917. It was a two-bay biplane of conventional design, with staggered wings, two open cockpits in tandem, and fixed, tailskid undercarriage.

The C.I was developed into the Sablatnig N.I in 1918.

Specifications

Notes

References

External links

http://1000aircraftphotos.com/Contributions/McBrideBill/9356.htm

1910s German military reconnaissance aircraft
Sablatnig aircraft
Single-engined tractor aircraft
Biplanes
Aircraft first flown in 1917